90210 (pronounced "nine-oh-two-one-oh") is an American teen drama television series, developed by Rob Thomas, Gabe Sachs, and Jeff Judah, that aired from September 2, 2008 to May 13, 2013, on The CW. It is the fourth series in the Beverly Hills, 90210 franchise created by Darren Star. The series was produced by CBS Television Studios.

Like its predecessor, the show follows the lives of several wealthy students attending West Beverly Hills High School in Beverly Hills, California. The show later focuses on the same group of friends when they graduate and begin their lives in the adult world. Some attend college at California University, while others begin exploring avenues beyond post-secondary education.

The show originally revolved around the Wilson family, including new Beverly Hills residents Annie Wilson (Shenae Grimes) and Dixon Wilson (Tristan Wilds). Their father, Harrison Wilson (Rob Estes) returns from Wichita, Kansas, to his Beverly Hills childhood home with his family to care for his mother, former television and theatre actress Tabitha Wilson (Jessica Walter), who has a drinking problem and clashes with his wife Debbie Wilson (Lori Loughlin). Annie and Dixon struggle to adjust to their new lives while making friends and adhering to their parents' wishes.

During the first two seasons, cast members from the original series made appearances, including Jennie Garth, Shannen Doherty, Ann Gillespie, Tori Spelling and Joe E. Tata. After the second season, however, they were not featured and rarely mentioned. The primary connection between the two series was the new series' character of Erin Silver (Jessica Stroup), the half-sister of Kelly Taylor and David Silver from the original series.

Series overview

Season 1 (2008–09) 

Tracy has a daughter of her own, Naomi Clark, who dates Jock Ethan Ward whom she soon breaks up with. Annie and Ethan then pursue a relationship after having dated the summer prior to Annie moving to Beverly Hills when Annie was visiting her grandmother for the summer. Both girls alternate between being friends, enemies, in a love triangle, and almost sisters, due to their parents' child. Their respective mothers find themselves in a love triangle of their own after Tracy's marriage to Charles Clark implodes and she appears to want Harry back. Naomi's fight with Annie forces her out of the crowd after she starts her many plots of manipulation and revenge when she uses Annie's ex-boyfriend from Kansas, Jason, as a weapon to get back at her for hiding her relationship with Ethan. She becomes friends with a group of older girls and starts flirting with Ozzie, a rather alternative student, and later becomes attracted to a bartender named Liam, whom she soon finds out is actually her age and becomes a student at West Beverly High. Meanwhile, Ethan and Annie's relationship hits the rocks as he begins to rethink his life after a car accident and gets more or less attracted to Rhonda, the girl he hit. Soon Naomi and Liam begin a romance, and once she becomes friends with Annie again, Liam's repetitive indecisiveness begins as he wants to pursue both of them.

Naomi's best friend, fallen starlet Adrianna Tate-Duncan, battles a drug addiction. This gets her into trouble when Harry decides to raid the school, thanks to the help of a cop, Kimberly McIntyre, undercover as a student. Kimberly begins a relationship with teacher/lacrosse coach Ryan Matthews, which gets him into trouble with the school. Guilt-ridden, Kimberly does her best to solve the case, giving Ryan his job back, although he takes a leave of absence to rethink his life, and Adrianna lands in rehab, after almost getting Naomi in legal troubles as she took the blame for the drugs. There, she begins a relationship with Navid Shirazi, head of the school's paper and Dixon's best friend, who paid for her rehab. Navid and Adrianna are in completely different friend groups in high school. Adrianna was more outgoing and popular while Navid was more focused on his studies. Navid's dream was to have an opportunity to date Adrianna. Although at first she only does it to "repay" him, they start to genuinely care about each other. Adrianna later discovers she is pregnant as a result of her promiscuity while she was addicted. After telling Navid of her pregnancy, he breaks up with her. It is later revealed that the father of Adrianna's child is Ty, although it is unclear when they slept together. She and Navid get back together when he realizes that even though she is a mess he can't get over her which leads to their engagement, although he alienates his family when he tells them that the child is not his and gets upset when Adrianna reveals her daughter is Ty's. Navid's family is very close-knit and is in some ways conservative. Ironically, this only applies to some areas of life, seeing that his dad runs an adult entertainment business.

Another featured character is Erin Silver (who goes by her last name), Kelly Taylor and David Silver's half-sister and Naomi's former best friend, until Silver's father's affair is revealed by Naomi, although she eventually reconciles her friendship with Naomi. She quickly befriends Annie and starts dating Dixon, who is somewhat taken aback by her not-so-90210 lifestyle, as she is a virgin who doesn't care about popularity. In a multi-episode arc that culminated in a very special episode, it is revealed that Silver has bipolar disorder. Kelly Taylor is now a guidance counselor at West Beverly and has a son named Sammy. Kelly becomes Silver's guardian after their mother proves to be an inadequate caretaker for Silver due to her alcoholism. Kelly briefly dates Ryan but discovers that he also slept with Brenda, re-creating the rift between the two friends. Following Brenda's discovery that she cannot have children, however, the women are drawn together in an accord once again.

At the prom, Adrianna goes into labor. She gives birth to a daughter whom she gives up for adoption. It is also revealed that Brenda has adopted a child from China. Ethan begins to realize his feelings for Silver, which leads to a confrontation with Dixon and a kiss with Silver. At Naomi and Jen's (her sister) after-prom party, Liam sleeps with Jen. He is mad that Naomi told Jen about his past: he wanted to keep it a secret. However, he was not aware that Jen was Naomi's sister, and upon finding out is horrified. Naomi finds out about it but thinks that Annie was with Liam, not Jen. This culminates in a major fight between Annie and Naomi where Annie is shunned by her peers, runs away, gets in her car drunk, and accidentally runs over a man. Annie is not sure whether or not this man survived.

Season 2 (2009–10)

Season two begins with the end of summer school. Naomi unknowingly dates a married man in an attempt to get over Liam, who shows up at West Beverly on the first day of school after being absent for the entire summer. Silver and Dixon get back together but break up when he finds out Silver kissed Ethan. It is also revealed that Ethan has decided to stay in Montana with his father. Adrianna is desperate to become a normal teenager, giving up acting, and, much to Navid's dismay, their relationship is put under further pressure with the arrival of Teddy Montgomery, Adrianna's ex-boyfriend (to whom Adrianna lost her virginity). Meanwhile, the emotionally distant and guilt-ridden Annie has cut herself from society as much as possible, contributing to a growing discord between her and her brother, who is angry at her for sending him to summer school. Annie begins to date Jasper, which began as a guilt-ridden friendship but later turned into a relationship. Jasper is different from any other boy Annie has dated. He is quieter and more mysterious compared to her past boyfriends.

Dixon meets a girl named Sasha when he begins his DJing career and is performing near her on a yacht, to whom he lies about his real age. Navid and Adrianna's relationship continues to tremble when Adrianna continues to find Teddy alluring. In the meantime, Harry and Debbie face marital problems when Harry confides to Kelly about his family troubles. Naomi finds out that her SAT scores are not high enough to get into California University, so she decides to date the Dean of Admission's son, Richard. She later falls for Richard's roommate, Jamie. Sasha finally learns about Dixon's real age when Debbie accidentally shows Sasha, whom she met by chance in a salon and does not know, a picture of her son Dixon who is only in high school.

Silver accompanies Adrianna to an AA meeting where she sees her mother, Jackie. Silver learns that Jackie has breast cancer. Kelly forbids Silver to see their mother try to relieve the pain, but Silver moves in with her mother to take care of her. Adrianna breaks up with Navid to get back with Teddy but learns that Teddy does not want a relationship, which makes Adrianna feel sorry for the mistake she has made. Jen continues to manipulate both Naomi and Ryan by manipulating Naomi into lending her a large amount of money, and by persuading Ryan that Liam is hitting on her. Silver, being paired up with Teddy, learns that Teddy's mother died, which causes a friendship to blossom. Liam meets Ivy, a surfer whom he butts heads with. They form a friendship, which is later made complicated by Ivy having feelings for Liam, feelings which Liam rebuffs. Navid and Gia launch an investigation, believing that Jasper is a drug dealer. Being upset about her breakup with Navid, Adrianna relapses on drugs. Sasha tells Dixon she is pregnant, about which Debbie and Harry think she is lying. Debbie, Dixon's mother, meets Sasha and she finds out that Sasha is not really pregnant, and advises her to stay away from her son. Jackie and Teddy give Silver her half-birthday by recreating the previous half-birthdays that Jackie could not attend because of her alcoholism. Later, Jackie is hospitalized, during which time Kelly and Jackie reconcile before Jackie dies.

Navid witnesses Adrianna buying drugs from Jasper which causes him to confront them. Liam finally confides to Dixon, Teddy, and Ivy about the events on prom night as they try to figure out a way to get revenge on Jen. Their attempt to get revenge on Jen works, which makes Jen lose everything she has including her sister and boyfriend Ryan. Teddy begins to pursue Silver more and they share a kiss on the rooftop of the school. Teddy asks Silver out to the dance, but she declines. Navid is hospitalized when Jasper pushes him down the stairs at school because he finds out that Navid is telling people that he is a drug dealer. Navid remembers that it was Jasper who pushed him down the stairs and is determined to let Annie know he is a drug dealer. Navid asks Adrianna to admit to Annie that she bought drugs from Jasper. After Dixon realizes that Jen is the one who slept with Liam and not Annie, he opts to help Annie. Naomi also feels bad for Annie when she learns the truth about prom night. At the dance, Teddy and Silver share a kiss. Silver storms off but later admits to Naomi that she felt something when they kissed. Just as Silver is about to tell Teddy that she wants to give it a shot, she sees him hugging a girl, not knowing it is Teddy's sister. Dixon reveals to Silver that he still has feelings for her, after which he lies and says that he did not know who the girl was that Teddy was embracing. Naomi, Navid, Dixon, and Silver reveal to Annie the truth about Jasper with the help of Adrianna. Annie confronts Jasper about his lies and he reveals to her that he knows she was the one who killed his uncle.

After Christmas break, Jasper blackmails Annie into staying with him. Annie finally decides to end it with Jasper, who then tries to commit suicide by jumping off of the Hollywood Sign. In the hospital, he tells Annie that he will keep her secret about the hit-and-run. Adrianna reaches out to fellow Alcoholics Anonymous member Gia for help with staying sober. To make Gia's ex-girlfriend jealous, Adrianna kisses her. Adrianna and Gia become good friends, and when Gia reveals her feelings for Adrianna, they become a couple but break up after Gia cheats on Adrianna with her ex-girlfriend. Adrianna is approached by Laurel (Ivy's mother) about a recording contract, and she accepts. Navid decides that he wants to win Adrianna back, while Dixon and Ivy explore a relationship with each other. Dixon gets caught up in gambling, getting him into trouble at school with some boys he owes money to. Dixon's issue with gambling is a true addiction to the point where he begins borrowing money from his friends and losing it all. Silver and Teddy begin a relationship and continue despite his father offering her money to break up with Teddy. Teddy is a huge tennis player and has a bright future of that in front of him and his dad does not want any girls getting in the way.

Naomi and Liam start their relationship fresh. Naomi admits to Liam that she has been feigning interest in things he likes and that she needs to be true to herself, even if it means their relationship won't work. This is what Liam wants, and their relationship becomes more stable; however, when Naomi is forced to come clean over false rumors she spread claiming that she was sexually harassed by a teacher, Mr. Cannon, Liam decides that he needs a break from her. During this time, Annie and Liam become closer and he consoles her after she overhears her mother, Debbie, confessing to her father, Harry, that she kissed her yoga instructor. His consolation causes Annie to believe that Liam is flirting with her, but realizing that this was not his intent, Annie instead advises Liam to stay with Naomi, as she does not want to ruin her friendship again over a boy. Liam begins to have his own troubles when his father returns, pretending that he wants to have a relationship with his son. But when Liam steals very valuable coins from his stepfather in hopes of starting a life with his father, he abandons Liam. Naomi becomes distracted by her pregnant sister Jen returning to town and causing trouble for Naomi. Naomi finds out that Ryan is the father of Jen's baby, and informs him of his impending fatherhood.

Jen does not want Ryan to have anything to do with the future of their baby, but Ryan is insistent that he should be involved. After Liam breaks up with her, a devastated Naomi is raped by Mr. Cannon, who tells her that after her initial false accusations, nobody will believe her. Mr. Cannon and Naomi had been working on a digital media project when they had become close and worked after hours on a project. This is also when Naomi was attacked by Mr. Cannon. Dixon leaves for Australia with Ivy after witnessing his parents having another argument. Harry informs Debbie that he was fired as principal of West Beverly after covering up an incident at school for Dixon. Annie reveals to Liam about the hit-and-run, and he encourages her to confess. Jasper is jealous that Annie and Liam are spending so much time together and sets fire to Liam's boat that he has been working on for a very long time. Liam sees this and attacks Jasper as the police arrive.

Season 3 (2010–11)

Season three begins with Beverly Hills being shaken up by an earthquake as the main characters start out their senior year. Naomi spent the summer isolating herself, assuring her friends' visits by promising money from her trust fund. She decides to report her rape by Mr. Cannon but backs out after discovering that her case will be made more difficult by her previous false accusations. Later, her sister Jen overhears Naomi and Silver's conversation and decides to take matters into her own hands with the help of Ryan, who had seen Cannon and Naomi in the school while he was there drunk. When Naomi finds enough proof to press charges, Cannon disappears. Cannon was from the UK and had actually been accused many times of rape prior to attacking Naomi. Later, Jen feels that she is a bad mother, and leaves her son in the hands of Ryan.

Meanwhile, Annie and Dixon are going through rough times after their parents' divorce and attempt to keep the family close. Debbie deals with the realities of being a newly single mother. Annie has spent the summer on house arrest (in addition to being on probation and having a suspended license) after confessing to her hit-and-run. Annie and Liam have feelings for each other but think it best to put them away so it doesn't interfere with their relationships with others. Annie finds romance with a college student, Charlie, who turns out to be Liam's half-brother. Charlie and Annie have a lot in common and both are theater kids. Liam has a tumultuous relationship with Charlie due to their rocky past. Teddy and Silver are happy to be together, but in the earthquake, Teddy injures his leg, which could possibly end his tennis career.

Teddy is also struggling with his sexuality, after realizing that he drunkenly slept with another guy, Ian. After some discouraging behavior from Teddy, Silver breaks up with him. This discouraging behavior was a result of Teddy being so insecure about being gay. With all that going on in school, Adrianna is driving back from a summer of touring with the pop star, Javier. The two become a couple until Navid reveals to Adrianna that he has never stopped loving her, and she dumps Javier for Navid. Although he initially resolves to get her back, Javier becomes angered by this. He tells her that her singing career is over, before dying in a car crash, which Adrianna survives. She steals Javier's songbook and performs one of his songs at his memorial service, which becomes a hit. She is then blackmailed by Javier's uncle, Victor, who becomes her manager and takes a huge portion of her earnings and forces her to do some things she finds uncomfortable, such as taking half-naked photos and forming a snobby famous image that did not exist before. Navid, realizing the blackmail, asks Adrianna not to give in to Victor's threats. Adrianna decides to take control of her career from Victor after seeing herself on the cover of a magazine. She begins to treat Victor badly and starts alienating Navid and her friends. Navid, however, begins to have family problems when he and Silver discover that his father has been employing underage girls to be in his porn films. Adrianna is oblivious to his problems, causing him and Silver to become closer.

Continuing with relationships, Ivy is still with Dixon but returns from Australia with her old childhood friend, Oscar, who seems to make Dixon uncomfortable. Oscar has hidden motives for revenge on Laurel, Ivy's mother, who he believes is responsible for his mother's suicide. He and Laurel have been sleeping together secretly throughout the summer, and the next step of his plan is to sleep with Ivy as well. When he succeeds, in taking her virginity, both of them find out, leaving Ivy upset with her mother. Dixon breaks up with Ivy out of fear after finding out from his ex-girlfriend Sasha that he may be HIV positive, though he later tests negative (Oscar had bribed Sasha to tell Dixon this in order to make him leave Ivy so that he could make a move). Dixon and Ivy get back together, but Dixon then finds out that Oscar took Ivy's virginity on the night she and Dixon had argued and the two break up again. Naomi starts to fall for Oscar, even though Ivy has warned her of his actions. When he offers to be her boyfriend, she declines. However, unluckily for Naomi, Mr. Cannon is waiting for her in her hotel room when she returns from Adrianna's Christmas party. Mr. Cannon holds Naomi hostage and invites Silver to come over. Once she arrives, Mr. Cannon ties her up as well and tells the girls of his plan to prove his innocence and go to the bank to drain Naomi's trust fund. Silver and Naomi gang up and attack Mr. Cannon. Naomi wants to slit his throat but Silver talks her out of it and calls the police.

Liam reconciles with Charlie after a heart-to-heart conversation in which they discuss the physical abuse they endured as children. After Charlie discovers that Annie has true feelings for Liam, he leaves to study abroad in France, leaving Annie and Liam to start a relationship. Annie begins to have other troubles, however, when her cousin Emily visits from Kansas. Emily starts to take over things in Annie's life; her friends, her acting roles, her internship, and her relationship with Liam. Annie and Liam find a way to prove Emily's scheming ways to everyone, running her out of town. Teddy has continued to struggle with his homosexuality and his feelings for Ian. After being blackmailed anonymously, and with encouragement from Ian, he decides to come out to his friends. He later discovers that Ian was the one who blackmailed him and breaks up with him. After a serious accident during surf practice, Ivy is prescribed medical marijuana to help relieve anxiety, and meets Raj. Raj reveals to Ivy that he has cancer and they start a close friendship that blossoms into a relationship after he helps her recover from her fear of getting back into the water. Adrianna's secret about stealing Javier's songbook is revealed by Victor, which damages her burgeoning career.

Navid and Silver have developed a secret relationship. Navid breaks up with Adrianna due to her new self-centered behavior, after which Adrianna discovers that Navid had been cheating on her with Silver. During a retreat, Naomi meets Guru Sona, whom she believes to have good intentions, but later realizes that she scammed her out of a large sum of money. A nerdy guy, Max, helps her get her money back, after which Naomi develops feelings for him. Naomi and Max begin secretly dating to protect their respective reputations, but after the pressure to keep things a secret becomes too much for Naomi, they decide to out their relationship. A newly vindictive Adrianna decides to exact revenge on Silver for her betrayal. After continuing to feud with each other, Silver and Adrianna call a truce and resolve their friendship. Later though, Adrianna deceives Silver and switches her bipolar medication with placebos, causing Silver to spin out of control. After noticing Silver's strange behavior, Navid and Dixon intervene and have Silver committed to a mental hospital.

Annie begins working as a personal assistant to an aging actress, Marla Templeton. Annie begins to worry about Marla's well-being after she starts to show signs of dementia and finds pamphlets on assisted suicide. She convinces Marla to attend a re-release of one of her films, which seems to reinvigorate Marla. However, when Annie arrives at Marla's home the next day, she discovers that she has committed suicide. Still reeling from his breakup with Ian, Teddy meets a new guy, Marco. He and Marco eventually begin dating. Jen returns to California and tells Ryan that she wants another chance at raising their son, which they eventually agree upon. While Silver is in the hospital, Adrianna takes the opportunity to get close to Navid by getting him drunk and telling him that they kissed. When Navid continues to reject her, Adrianna tells Silver that Navid kissed her, effectively breaking them up.

Raj's health worsens, making him and Ivy concerned for his life. Ivy and Raj decide to get married. During the bachelor/bachelorette party, Silver's stolen medication falls out of Adrianna's purse. After being shunned by her friends and considering suicide, Adrianna resolves to become a better person. Max cheats on a paper for Naomi, and when they are caught, Naomi takes the blame. During graduation, Max confesses that it was he who cheated, thus allowing Naomi to graduate. After Marla's death, Annie is informed that she has inherited Marla's entire estate. Liam decides not to attend college and takes a job on a fishing boat during the summer. Annie is very sad about this. Max is told that he must stay away from Naomi by his parents, but she later reveals to him that she is pregnant.

Season 4 (2011–12)

Season four begins with Naomi breaking up with Max after what she feels is his excessive relief on discovering that her pregnancy was a false positive.

At the end of the summer, the various kids are preparing to move on with their lives. Liam comes back from his job on the fishing boat and asks Annie twice to marry him; she says no both times. Liam drunkenly buys a beach bar and starts to develop feelings for a widow he met over the summer. Silver and Navid are living together as Navid manages his business, but are forced to take in his rebellious teenage sister, Leila (Summer Bishil), when she refuses to go to boarding school. His life is complicated by Leila's rebellious nature and by the discovery that his uncle has been running a stolen car ring out of Shirazi Studios. Not only is this tough on Navid, but also on Silver who is doing most of Leila's babysitting. Ivy finds herself dealing with the emotional toll of Raj's deteriorating health. Naomi, attempting to make a big impression at CU buys a large house, coming into conflict with the owner's son Austin (Justin Deeley), who had been growing marijuana on the property. Austin is a very rich, down-to-earth countryman. He is very different than Naomi's ex-boyfriend Max, who was the complete opposite. Naomi throws a big elaborate beginning-of-school party for CU students, but this backfires when the party is raided by the police and Naomi disposes of Austin's marijuana plants by tossing them on a bonfire, causing CU's star quarterback to later test positive for drug use.

The disastrous party causes Naomi to enter CU as the most unpopular girl in school, a situation she attempts to rectify by pledging a popular sorority. Initially, things appear to be going well as Naomi is taken under the wing of the sorority President, Holly (Megalyn Echikunwoke). But after performing a series of humiliating hazing rituals, Naomi discovers that Holly never intended to let her into the sorority and that this was all done to humiliate Naomi. Vowing revenge, Naomi buys her way into the only sorority that will have her: one made up of nerds and social rejects, and becomes their president. Naomi has sex with Austin after he agrees to help her new sorority humiliate Holly. However, she later learns that Austin was using her to break up with Holly, whom he had been dating. When Holly invites Max to a campus event to unsettle Naomi, she rekindles her romance with him, but still finds herself attracted to Austin. Naomi later ends up with Austin and she and Holly become short-lived friends. After Naomi gets the internship that Holly wanted, Holly retaliates by attempting to sleep with Austin. Ironically the internship that Naomi received was given to her by Holly's mother, which causes family tension between Holly and her mother. Naomi hits Holly where it really hurts; she wins over Holly's mother.

Annie finally gets her inheritance when she records Jeremy calling Marla a bitch. Liam gets into a motorcycle accident while trying to find Annie. A blonde woman named Vanessa, who hits Liam with her car, calls 911 and says that it was a "hit and run". When the winter premiere begins, Liam has been hanging out with Vanessa as she has been trying to transform Liam into a star by managing his career. Annie and Dixon return from Paris after spending Annie's newfound wealth. Silver finds out by the end of the episode that her boyfriend's adopted daughter might be Adrianna's. Dixon has a mild stroke and is taken to the hospital. The doctor informs him that he needs to avoid stress, but he's been under the pressure of hiding his newfound success with his music career without Adrianna. Liam consoles Silver, who learns that she may have the cancer gene that caused her mother's death two years ago. Upon being discharged from the hospital, Dixon notices Ivy's husband Raj has been admitted to the same hospital and learns that Raj's cancer has returned and he's dying. However, Raj tells Dixon not to tell Ivy, but Dixon disobeys his wishes and breaks the bad news to Ivy.

Ivy visits the hospital, and along with the support of her friends, makes amends with Raj. As she returns to Raj's room, she learns that he has died in his sleep. Naomi's sister Jen makes an unexpected visit, and her arrival sparks yet another falling out between the two sisters. This time, the sisters fight over the affections of Preston "P.J." Hillingsbrook, a playboy with a lot of cash to blow as the heir to his family's fortune. When he reveals that it was Naomi that he was originally infatuated with, Jen does another disappearing act and returns to Paris, but not before revealing to Naomi that P.J. was involved in a scandal. At Raj's funeral, the record company calls Dixon's phone, which Adrianna had in her possession, and she finds out that they've signed him but not her. Navid comes back for the funeral, and the gang pays their final respects to Raj at the beach. Meanwhile, Liam and Vanessa break up over her attitude towards Silver. She then steals all the money from the bar. Silver learns that she is positive for the cancer gene and cries on Liam's shoulder. The two kiss and sleep together. Ivy is seen late at night at the beach with her surfboard. Caleb who is at the beach warns her about the danger of surfing in the rough waves but Ivy heads on muttering to herself "Nothing lasts forever right" and runs into the water.

Later, the scandal behind P.J. is that in order to receive his trust fund he must marry before he turns 28 years old, and so he proposes to Naomi, unbeknownst to her. Annie finds out about the clause and tells P.J. to come clean to Naomi, which he is about to do but chickens out, and instead asks if she will take his last name. Annie and the girls are with Naomi at a wedding dress store and Annie tells Naomi about P.J.'s secret. As Naomi learns the truth, she breaks off the engagement. While Dixon is away, Austin returns to town and suggests that Adrianna should start a country music career with his help. Adrianna accepts his offer. But as Austin becomes her manager, he also has his eyes set on steering Adrianna away from Dixon. Navid also returns and reveals that he wants to resume his relationship with Silver, who has found out she has the cancer gene. This causes a dramatic turn, as both Liam and Navid want to be with Silver. A fight breaks out between Liam and Navid during the premiere of Liam's new movie. As a result, Silver decides to side with Navid. Meanwhile, Naomi is the event planner for a young woman named Madison who is enthused by her upcoming nuptials. Naomi gets the shock of her life when she learns that the groom-to-be is none other than Max, her ex-boyfriend. At the bachelor party Max questions Naomi, asking her if he is doing the right thing, and before she can reply is interrupted by Max's fiancée.

During the rehearsal wedding, Holly's mother offers Naomi a job offer that she cannot refuse. Naomi takes the offer, but at the airport is talked out of it by Austin because she is still in love with Max. As the wedding of Madison and Max begins, Naomi abruptly interrupts the services and confesses her love for Max. Elsewhere, Ivy is seen going off to Mexico to be with Diego, who was deported because he was an illegal immigrant in the U.S. and only ask for a one-way ticket. Diego and Ivy had begun dating and Diego had helped cease the pain she had been feeling after Raj's death. Diego was arrested for illegal graffiti, and that is why he was being deported. Annie and Caleb break off their relationship because Caleb cannot leave the covenant for Annie; nor does she think he should. Navid reveals that he isn't ready to have a baby, which causes Silver to dump him. She still wants to conceive a child and proposes to have a baby...with Teddy. At the very end of the season finale, Adrianna is boarding a plane to Las Vegas to kickstart her country music career because Dixon has not returned on time from the tour, but little does she know the car broke down and he had to hitchhike. As Dixon is on the phone with Navid telling him to stop Adrianna, a truck hits Dixon's car and it is left unknown if Dixon is still alive.

Season 5 (2012–13)

Season five starts out with the viewers finding out that Dixon is not dead, and the gang must come to terms with Dixon's new disability. Vanessa comes back into Liam's life asking for a second chance, but Liam refuses. Navid and Liam are drinking at the beach after finding out Silver asked Teddy to be the father of her baby. Angry about Silver, Liam accidentally starts a fire in his bar and walks away from it. Obsessed Vanessa appears again and blackmails Liam into being in a relationship with her.

Naomi and Max throw a party for their marriage and Max's business partner Alec invites special guests to build their business up again. Liam and Vanessa turn up at the party together and Vanessa tells everyone that she and Liam are engaged, which causes shock to everyone and Silver disappears to get drunk. Adrianna gets a kiss from someone while Dixon is in a wheelchair trying to reach for Adrianna's scarf but fails and falls out of his wheelchair; Annie arrives to help Dixon. After the party, Liam is very upset and has an argument with Vanessa, which leads to Vanessa falling off the balcony. In shock, Liam rushes to the phone to call 911 to report an accident and runs back to the balcony and sees Vanessa's body is gone.

Trying her hardest to get on Alec's good side, Naomi and Alec take a trip to the amusement park, having so much fun Alec kisses Naomi, which causes her to run away. Annie drops Dixon off at a therapy group and a girl called Megan starts talking about the accident her father died Dixon realizes he was in that accident too, which makes him run away. Liam gets a visit from the police. Attempting to feel better, Liam helps Dixon surf again. Silver tells Adrianna she made an appointment for getting pregnant. Walking on the beach Riley tells Annie how he came to be in a wheelchair. Liam goes to the police to tell them about Vanessa and finds out something unexpected. Dixon thanks Annie for helping him and Megan comes to say hi to Dixon. Silver does a surprising photoshoot, Alec and Naomi talk about their kiss and choose to stay friends. Alec with a smirk on his face is looking at some shocking photos that could ruin Naomi and Max forever.

Liam enrolls in a business law class while Naomi plans on telling Max the truth about her and Alec, but whilst away on their romantic trip she freaks out over a trust exercise. Silver finds the nude pictures have leaked online and has to use Annie's new friend Collin.

In the series finale, Adrianna is stuck in the rubble after the explosion at the theater. Navid returns to the scene to find Adrianna amongst the wreckage, where they realize their love for one another and vow to plan their future together. Naomi throws a relief concert for the theater explosion and later decides to fly out to Washington DC after making amends with Jordan. Silver receives the devastating news that she has cancer, however, she states that she will do everything she can to put up a fight. Annie decides to stay in Paris after her book tour finishes. While saying goodbye, Dixon reminds Annie that he will be there for her no matter what. As Annie prepares for takeoff, Liam chases after the plane on his motorcycle. The plane comes to a stop and Liam gets down on one knee, proposing to Annie. He says that he has always loved her and will not take "no" for an answer. After Annie tearfully accepts, the news spreads quickly to friends who share in the excitement. The episode ends with Annie and Liam hugging one another in a joyful embrace.

Cast and characters

Notes

Characters

The first actor to be cast was Dustin Milligan on April 1, 2008, followed by AnnaLynne McCord on April 14. Sachs found Milligan to be "really funny", and changed Ethan to better represent his personality. McCord was cast because, according to Sachs, "she's someone who is worldly, and there's a sophistication to her that's interesting". The role of Annie was given to Shenae Grimes, who says she was raised watching the original series. Sachs and Judah had seen Grimes' work before and knew "she had the acting chops", and she was cast after acting a dramatic scene which she "just killed". Sachs stated, "she can act, she's beautiful, and she can give this sweet cuteness [that lets us see] through her eyes into this world."

Lori Loughlin auditioned for the role of Debbie and was given the part straight away. Sachs thought that Loughlin was too established to read for the part, but realized that she understood the role immediately. The producers were fans of Jessica Walter after watching her film, Play Misty for Me. Sachs found that Walter knew pieces of scenes, and suggested "stuff that works". Sachs described Ryan Eggold, who portrayed Matthews, as "a sophisticated actor, and he's also very funny". Sachs believed that every time Eggold would be on screen, "people are going to go, 'Wow!'". The producers were looking for an actor who could portray Silver as a "quirky kid who moves to her own beat". Sachs explained that Jessica Stroup "came in dressed for the part, artsy and quirky, and she had her hair up and she had a bandanna. She nailed it." The producers were fans of Tristan Wilds for his acting on The Wire, and hoped to hire him as Dixon from the start of casting. When asked about Michael Steger, who portrays Navid, Sachs said "he's just great". Rob Estes, the last actor to join the series, was a previous cast member of the first Beverly Hills, 90210 spin-off, Melrose Place. Estes was sought by The CW to play Harry, but was contracted on the drama Women's Murder Club. When that series was canceled, Sachs called Estes and explained the spin-off to him, and he thought it was a great idea. Sachs promised that although he was playing a parent, he would not "be furniture... as in the seldom seen or heard parents who populate many youth-centric series, like the Walsh parents on the original 90210."

The CW confirmed that Jennie Garth, Shannen Doherty, Tori Spelling and Joe E. Tata would be returning in recurring roles as their original characters. Sachs was familiar with Garth, and talked to her about a possible role in the series. Garth agreed to star on the series without reading a script after brainstorming ideas with Sachs. The producers offered Garth a role as a series regular, but she opted to sign on as a recurring character. Doherty decided to appear after talking with Sachs, but her appearance was moved to the second episode. Sachs described Tata's casting as an accident; a friend told Sachs that he had seen Tata in a store, which led to the offer of a recurring role in the series. Sachs said that Tata was ecstatic about the idea and agreed. After reading the script, Spelling expressed interest in returning, and the writers decided to give her character her own fashion line. Spelling was scheduled to appear in the première, but due to personal reasons and the birth of her daughter, she opted to appear later in the season.

Production

Conception
Once pitched, the project was put on the fast track by The CW, and an order of the pilot was expected by the end of the month. The Beverly Hills, 90210 creator, Darren Star, was announced not to be involved with the project. The only surviving element from the original series was believed to be Creative Artists Agency, the talent agency which conceived the spin-off idea. Veronica Mars creator Rob Thomas was in negotiations to write the pilot and Mark Piznarski was in talks to direct it.

Development
A detailed breakdown of the pilot written by Thomas was released on March 17, 2008, containing information on the plot and characters which would be in the series. None of the characters were related to the original series of 90210 which again aired a few years before except Erin Silver played by Jessica Stroup; however, the new series featured a similar premise: a family with two teenagers who recently moved from the Midwest to Beverly Hills. To reflect the situation at the Beverly Hills school, where around 40 percent of the students were of Persian descent, a student named Navid Shirazi was created. Thomas intended to introduce The Peach Pit, the diner from Beverly Hills, 90210, but noted that it would not be featured in the pilot. The writer considered giving the siblings a job at a movie theater, as he did not want them to use their parents' credit cards. Thomas revealed that there were plans to reintroduce one of the original cast members, but had not met with any of them to discuss a role. Thomas later elaborated the producers wanted to see "as many of the original cast members as possible", but were careful not to "parade them all out in the pilot".

On April 14, 2008, Thomas announced that he was sidelining the series to focus on his two pilots for ABC. Gabe Sachs and Jeff Judah were hired as the new executive producers and wrote a new version of the script in late April. Sachs said that although Thomas had a "great script", their version of the script was edgier. Judah said that they were trying to ground their script in reality, with real character stories and emotional stories. The writers wanted the audience to relate to the characters' problems, which they wanted to be truthful and emotional, but also comedic. The pair were interested in telling several stories simultaneously, featuring many characters. The pair changed the surname of the main family from Mills to Wilson, along with changing the name of the mother from Celia to Debbie. The pair also told reporters that they would be adding their "comedic impulses" to the script. Sachs and Judah found the parents to be an important part of the series, and designed to be contemporary parents. Since the producers were both fathers, they designed the script to include more prominent adult story lines and a strong point of view on parenting. Judah was interested in focusing on how the family kept their moral center when moving to Beverly Hills, and the way the parents dealt with their teenagers. On May 11, 2008, one day before The CW's upfront presentations, the network officially picked up the series for the 2008–2009 television season.

Despite the first season having the highest ratings of the entire series run, the show was largely considered unsuccessful during its first season. The characters were a hit. After disagreeing with the network executives over the series' storylines, Sachs and Judah ended their tenure as producers. The CW wanted the series to have a female perspective and focus more on teenage life and glamour; however, Judah and Sachs were more comfortable writing for men, featuring family stories. The studio brought in Rebecca Rand Kirshner Sinclair, co-executive producer of the popular show Gilmore Girls, to revamp the failing 90210. Sinclair is largely credited for saving the show, which had steady ratings in its third season. For the remainder of the first season, Judah worked in post-production, including editing and music supervision, while Sachs ran the production on set. Rebecca Sinclair began retooling the series as head writer and formally took over the show at the start of season two. In late February 2009, Sinclair signed a seven-figure deal with the producers to serve as executive producer/showrunner for the series' second and third seasons.

On February 16, 2010, The CW renewed the show for a third season. It was also moved to Mondays at 8/7c. On April 26, 2011, The CW renewed the show for a fourth season. On March 17, 2011, it was revealed that Sinclair would step down as executive producer when her contract expired at the end of season three. It was later announced that former Life Unexpected executive producers Patti Carr and Lara Olsen had been hired to take over the series. The show also returned to its debut timeslot, Tuesdays at 8:00 p.m. On May 3, 2012, The CW officially renewed 90210 for a fifth season.

DVR ratings for the series have sometimes doubled its broadcast ratings.

On January 13, 2013, CW president Mark Pedowitz stated that though the show hadn't had a season-six renewal in place, the show would most likely be back the following year for what would've been its final season as he said he was a "big believer in giving fans a very satisfactory conclusion" for a long-running show. However, on February 28, 2013, the announcement came that the fifth season would be its last.

Casting
On March 13, 2008, Kristin Dos Santos of E! confirmed that the series would be a spin-off with new characters and not a remake. In order for the project to be ready for the network's "upfront" presentations to advertisers in May, casting began before the script was completed.

Recurring
Original series actors Shannen Doherty, Jennie Garth and Joe E. Tata signed on for recurring roles during early production. Sachs was familiar with Garth, and talked to her about a possible role in the series. Garth agreed to work in the series without reading a script after brainstorming ideas with Sachs. Initially, the producers offered Garth a role as a series regular but, she opted to sign on as recurring instead.
Sachs met with Doherty over dinner and told her about the 90210 spin-off. Over the next few weeks, they established Brenda's backstory as a 'name' stage actress and Doherty agreed to guest-star in several episodes, appearing in the credits during the first half-season. Otherwise, Doherty only appeared in supporting roles.

From early on in the news reports of the upcoming series through most of the summer, it was reported that along with Doherty and Garth, Tori Spelling would be reprising her role as an older alumni of West Beverly Hills High. After reading the script, Tori Spelling expressed interest returning, and the writers decided to give Donna her own fashion line. Spelling was scheduled to appear in the premiere, but due to personal reasons and the birth of her daughter, she opted to appear later in the season. Backdrop retail store signage in the first several episodes during shopping excursions scenes and one setup line referring to her role foreshadowed the role that would be unfulfilled. By August 11, it was reported that Spelli of the series after discovering that she was receiving less pay than Garth and Doherty. Spelling asked for her salary of $20,000 per episode to be increased to match their salaries—$40,000 to $50,000 per episode—but when denied she left the show altogether.

Regulars
The first actor to be cast was Dustin Milligan as lacrosse player Ethan Ward, followed by AnnaLynne McCord as Naomi Clark. The role of aspiring actress Annie Wilson, won by Shenae Grimes, was originally offered to Hilary Duff, who turned it down due to dissatisfaction with the pilot script.

Jessica Lowndes was selected to portray actress and singer Adrianna Tate-Duncan, introduced as a theater performer who once had a drug addiction, and would also go through a teen pregnancy and many other serious conflicts as a dark character with many lovable aspects. The Adrianna Tate-Duncan role had been upgraded to a starring role in Jessica Walters' spot, Tristan Wilds was cast as step-brother to Annie Wilson; Lori Loughlin won the role of their mother, photographer wife Debbie Wilson. Michael Steger was cast as the school television news director and congenial very nice guy, Navid Shirazi who maintained the nice-guy status throughout all 114 episodes (2008-2013) of generally being walked on or victimized.
ay the part of Harry Wilson, and would only appear in the first two seasons. Estes was a previous cast member of the first Beverly Hills, 90210 spin-off, Melrose Place.

New direction
Sinclair announced in March 2009 that the series' second season would rely less on 90210 alums like Jennie Garth and Shannen Doherty to boost ratings. She felt that "the show tried to be a lot of things to a lot of people in its first season [...] I think the center lies with the generation of kids that are in high school now." It was also announced that Dustin Milligan ('Ethan Ward') would not be coming back for season two, while Matt Lanter would be joining the cast as a series regular. Casting soon began for new characters to be introduced in the second season. In June 2009, the series was reportedly looking for an actor to play the recurring role of Teddy, a tennis champ returning to West Beverly. Actor and model Trevor Donovan was later cast in the role. Ann Gillespie returned in the second season for multiple episodes as Jackie Taylor, Silver and Kelly's mother. Her character was once again sober and hoped to reconnect with her daughters after being diagnosed with cancer.

Filming
One of the show's locations was a complex on Waverly Drive in the Los Feliz neighborhood, designed by architect Bernard Maybeck in 1927 and best known as the convent of Immaculate Heart of Mary.

Broadcast
90210 first aired in the United States on The CW, Tuesdays at 8:00 pm Eastern/7:00 pm Central.

In the United Kingdom, the series airs on Channel 4 and E4, after beating off competition from Channel 5, ITV2 and Living for the rights to broadcast the show. In November 2018, 90210 was made available on Channel 4's All 4. In Australia, it aired on Network Ten for 6 episodes until the network pulled it from their schedules due to low ratings. However, in January 2011 it started airing on Eleven as part of a broadcast schedule aimed at a younger audience. Due to poor performance, Eleven also pulled 90210 off their schedule. It is now shown on Sunday Afternoons at 5:00 p.m. The show airs in Ireland on RTÉ Two, initially the show aired in a prime-time slot of Thursdays paired with Ugly Betty. When the show returned for its second season the show was moved to an early morning timeslot of just after midnight where it still airs. In India, it airs on Big CBS Channels.

90210 went on its mid-season break on December 10, 2012, and is scheduled to return on January 21, 2013, at a new time slot of 9:00 pm, one week after the premiere of The Carrie Diaries, which took its original time slot of 8:00 pm.

DVR ratings for the series have sometimes doubled its broadcast ratings.

On January 13, 2013, CW president Mark Pedowitz stated that though the show hadn't had a season 6 renewal in place, the show would most likely be back the following year for what would've been its final season as he said he was a "big believer in giving fans a very satisfactory conclusion" for a long-running show  However, on February 28, 2013, the announcement came that the fifth season would be its last.

Reception

Ratings
Seasonal rankings (based on average total viewers per episode) of 90210 on The CW.

The series premiere was seen by 4.65 million U.S. viewers. The UK premiere was seen by 468,000 viewers on E4.

The second season premiered to 2.56 million viewers and achieved 1.3 rating in the Adults 18-49 demographic, up 18% from its first-season finale but down 50% from its series premiere. Although ratings decreased after its three-month hiatus it was the #1 most successful show on DVR in the 18-49 percentage increase between March 22–28 increasing to a 1.1 rating. DVR ratings for the show have sometimes doubled its broadcast ratings. The CW have described its DVR ratings as some of the most impressive on TV and cited them as the reason for the series' fourth season renewal.

The third-season premiere was viewed by 1.96 million viewers in the United States and achieved a 0.9 rating in Adults 18–49. Episode 11 hit season highs in all categories with a 1.1 Adults 18-49 rating, 1.4 Adults 18-34 and 2.1 in The CW's target of Women 18–34. It was also the most watched episode in over a year with 2.18 million viewers tuning in. In the UK, the eighth episode of season three "Mother Dearest" was seen by 548,000 viewers, bettering its series premiere.

Critical response
Most reviews of the pilot were average. Metacritic gave the episode a Metascore—a weighted average based on the impressions of a select 12 critical reviews—of 46, signifying mixed or average reviews. Matthew Gilbert of The Boston Globe felt that like the original, 90210 was "pretty good". Gilbert said that the episode "seemed to take forever to set up some remarkably bland plotlines", which he found had been executed with more finesse by other teen soaps. The reviewer criticized the writers for "unimaginative material", and commented on the risqué oral sex scene. Gilbert claimed that the characters lacked depth and distinction throughout the pilot, especially Naomi, whom he compared negatively to Gossip Girls Blair Waldorf. By contrast, Tom Gliatto of People magazine gave Naomi Clark a favorable review, but stated that he felt the cast as a whole had yet to gel. When compared to the original series, Rob Owen of the Pittsburgh Post-Gazette felt that the spin-off covered the same themes—family, friends, teen melodrama, relationships—but with more humor. Owen praised the compelling characters and the acting, and found the dialogue to be more painful than clever.

As the show continued its first season, the response became considerably more positive, and by the second season critical response was favorable. Entertainment Weekly gave the second season an A−, stating that "all it took was a little sunshine to give this show some heat", and that the "new, trashier take is working" after what they considered a "drippy" first season. LaDale Anderson of Canyon News commented on the change between the first two seasons, saying that "the transformation of the characters and storylines in season two has been fantastic", and "sometimes a show needs a makeover and with the right pieces in place a not so good show can become something sensational." The reviewer opined that "what has worked so well [...] is that the characters are not one-dimensional. With most shows characters seamlessly continue to embody characteristics that solely define them, but not here." Anderson also praised the writing, saying it was "intricate and intertwines itself without forcing the storylines to connect; they mesh naturally."

Awards and accolades

Home media
All seasons are available on DVD. The streaming editions of the show, however, differ from the original airing and home media, with the original soundtracks replaced due to fees.

References

External links

 
 

2000s American high school television series
2000s American LGBT-related drama television series
2000s American teen drama television series
2008 American television series debuts
2010s American high school television series
2010s American LGBT-related drama television series
2010s American teen drama television series
2013 American television series endings
American sequel television series
American television soap operas
American primetime television soap operas
90210
English-language television shows
Gay-related television shows
Serial drama television series
Teenage pregnancy in television
Television series about families
Television series about teenagers
Television series by CBS Studios
Television series by Spelling Television
Television shows set in Beverly Hills, California
Television shows filmed in Los Angeles
The CW original programming